Scrobipalpa splendens is a moth in the family Gelechiidae found in Mongolia. It was described by Povolný in 1973.

References

Scrobipalpa
Moths described in 1973